The Men's floor competition at the 2016 Summer Olympics was held at the HSBC Arena on 14 August.

The medals were presented by Sir Philip Craven IOC member, Great Britain and Steve Butcher, FIG Men's Artistic Gymnastics Technical Committee President.

Competition format
The top 8 qualifiers in the qualification phase (limit two per NOC), based on combined score of each apparatus, advanced to the individual all-around final. The finalists performed on each apparatus again. Qualification scores were then ignored, with only final round scores counting.

Qualification

The gymnasts who ranked in the top eight qualified for the final round. If there were more than two gymnasts in same NOC, the last ranked among them would not qualify for the final round, and the next best ranked gymnast would qualify instead.

*When two athletes record the same total score, the one with the higher execution score finishes ahead. If the execution score is the same, then the one with the higher D-score finishes ahead. If the D-score is also the same, then they finish tied.

**Yūsuke Tanaka of Japan was skipped even though he qualified within the top eight because of the strict “two per country” (2 per NOC) rule in individual apparatus finals, and Shirai and Uchimura had already placed ahead of Tanaka.

Final

Crowd Controversy
Max Whitlock of Great Britain was a somewhat unexpected winner. Kenzō Shirai of Japan, the two-time and reigning world champion on floor, was the overwhelming favorite owing to the extremely high difficulty of his routine and excellent execution. But on this occasion Shirai had problems with his landings on three of his six passes. In separate interviews after the competition, both Shirai and American Sam Mikulak, who was the top qualifier but finished in last place, expressed disappointment with the crowd, whose booing and jeering had grown increasingly loud during non-Brazilian routines as the competition went on. Whitlock had avoided this due to his early draw in the final performance.

References

Men's floor
2016
Men's events at the 2016 Summer Olympics